The 1941–42 Penn State Nittany Lions men's ice hockey season was the 3rd season of play for the program. The Nittany Lions represented Pennsylvania State University and were coached by Arthur Davis in his 2nd season.

Season
Penn State continued to play mostly against club teams from Pennsylvania. With the demise of the Penn-Ohio League the year before, the team would find it increasingly difficult to schedule opponents in the midst of World War II.

Roster

Standings

Schedule and Results

|-
!colspan=12 style=";" | Regular Season

Note: Most of Penn State's opponents were club teams.

Scoring Statistics

References

External links

Penn State Nittany Lions men's ice hockey seasons
Penn State
Penn State
Penn State
Penn State